Michael F. Currie (born February 1, 1955 in Charlottetown, Prince Edward Island) is a Canadian politician, who served in the Legislative Assembly of Prince Edward Island from 1996 to 2011. He represented the electoral district of Georgetown-St. Peters. He served in the Executive Council of Prince Edward Island as Minister of Transportation and Minister of Industry. Currie resigned his seat in the Legislative Assembly on March 28, 2011, to run as the Conservative candidate for Cardigan, in the 2011 Canadian federal election. On May 2, 2011, Currie was defeated in the federal election by Liberal incumbent Lawrence MacAulay.

In 2012, Currie partnered with the Cardigan Heritage Centre and the local branch of the Legion to initiate the establishment of a community Veteran memorial.

References

1955 births
Living people
People from Charlottetown
Progressive Conservative Party of Prince Edward Island MLAs
Conservative Party of Canada candidates for the Canadian House of Commons
Prince Edward Island candidates for Member of Parliament
Members of the Executive Council of Prince Edward Island